Cretodromia is a genus of true fly in the family Atelestidae. Cretodromia contains no living members, with the only known species Cretodromia glaesa having existed in the Campanian age of the Late Cretaceous epoch.

References

Empidoidea
Prehistoric Diptera genera